Luciano Vázquez (born 6 March 1985) is an Argentine footballer who currently plays for Al-Shahania as a striker.

References
 
 

1985 births
Living people
Argentine footballers
Argentine expatriate footballers
Expatriate footballers in Paraguay
Expatriate footballers in Chile
Expatriate footballers in Qatar
Expatriate footballers in the United Arab Emirates
Expatriate footballers in Jordan
Argentine expatriate sportspeople in Paraguay
Argentine expatriate sportspeople in Chile
Argentine expatriate sportspeople in Qatar
Argentine expatriate sportspeople in the United Arab Emirates
Argentine expatriate sportspeople in Jordan
Club Atlético Tembetary players
Huracán de Tres Arroyos footballers
Rivadavia de Lincoln footballers
Alumni de Villa María players
Central Córdoba de Santiago del Estero footballers
Villa Mitre footballers
Club Cipolletti footballers
Racing de Olavarría footballers
Ñublense footballers
Al-Shahania SC players
C.D. Huachipato footballers
Club Atlético Temperley footballers
Dibba FC players
Al-Markhiya SC players
Al-Faisaly SC players
Villa Dálmine footballers
Primera B Metropolitana players
Chilean Primera División players
Qatar Stars League players
Qatari Second Division players
Argentine Primera División players
UAE First Division League players
Jordanian Pro League players
Torneo Federal A players
Association football forwards
Footballers from Buenos Aires